Events from the year 1644 in France.

Incumbents 
Monarch: Louis XIV
Regent: Anne of Austria

Events

Births
 

 
 March 1 – Simon Foucher, French polemic (d. 1696)
 April 7 – François de Neufville, duc de Villeroy, French soldier (d. 1730)
 August 6 – Louise de La Vallière, French mistress of Louis XIV of France (d. 1710)
 September 22 – Jacques Échard, French bibliographer (d. 1724)
 October 1 – Jean Rousseau (violist), French musician (d. 1699)
 October 1 – Alessandro Stradella, Italian composer (d. 1682)
 October 2 – François-Timoléon de Choisy, French author (d. 1724)

Deaths

See also

References

1640s in France